The Indian state of Rajasthan has often been used as a site for filming movies and TV serials. The state has served as the backdrop for many Indian as well as foreign movies.

Famous films shot in Rajasthan include:
- Adimai Penn (MGR 's  Tamil film 1968
- Veera pandia Kattan bomman ( sivaji Ganesan ' s Tamil Film - 1959 ) 
 Kaanchli Life in a Slough (2020) at Jhadol, Udaipur
 Dhanak(2016) at Jaisalmer
 Agent Sai Srinivasa Athreya at Bidasar, Rajasthan 
 Mard, at Jaigarh Fort And Bamanwas, Sawai Madhopur
 Anamika (2008 film) at Gajner Palace, Bikaner
 Autobiography of a Princess, at Jodhpur
 Bade Miyan Chote Miyan, at City Palace, Jaipur
 Bajrangi Bhaijaan, at Mandawa, Jhunjhunu
 Bajirao Mastani, at Amer Palace, Jaipur
 Badrinath Ki Dulhania, at Kota
 The Best Exotic Marigold Hotel
 Bol Bachchan, at Chomu Palace, Jaipur, Rajasthan
 Border
 Chalo Dilli, at Jhunjhunu
 Chaar Din Ki Chandni, at Khimsar, (at jaipur)
 Chor Machaaye Shor, at Mubarak Mahal, Jaipur
 The Darjeeling Limited, at Jodhpur
 Das Wilde Leben, at Jaipur
 The Deceivers
 Delhi 6, at Sambhar, Jaipur
 Dor
 Ek Paheli Leela, at Jodhpur, Nagaur and Bikaner
 Eklavya: The Royal Guard
 The Fall, at Jaipur and Jodhpur
 The Far Pavilions
 Gadar: Ek Prem Katha
 Ghulami, at Fatehpur, Rajasthan and Jhunjhunu
 Goliyon Ki Raasleela Ram-Leela, at Udaipur
 Guide, at Udaipur, Chittorgarh
 Dhanak at Jaisalmer
 Gulaal at Jaipur
 Highway, at Bikaner
 Holy Smoke!, at Jaipur
 Hum Dil De Chuke Sanam, at Bada Bagh, Jaisalmer
 Hum Saath-Saath Hain: We Stand United, at Jodhpur
 Humraaz (Bobby Deol), at Jaigadh Fort, Jaipur
 Jai Ho Beimaan Ki, at Udaipur
 Jab We Met, at Mandawa
 The Jewel in the Crown, at Udaipur
 Jodhaa Akbar
 The Jungle Book (1994), at Mehrangarh Fort
 Kaalo, at Jodhpur, Jaisalmer
 Karan Arjun, at Sariska Palace, Alwar
 Khoobsurat (Sonam Kapoor), at Laxmi Niwas, Bikaner
 Lamhe, at Kanak Vrindavan and Shishodia Garden, Jaipur
 Lekin
 Main Tulsi Tere Aangan Ki, at Udaipur
 Manorama Six Feet Under at Jhunjhunu
 Meera
 Mera Saaya, at Udaipur
 Mughal-e-Azam, at Jaipur
 I Am Kalam, at Bikaner
 Namastey London, at Ajmer Dargah
 Nanhe Jaisalmer
 Nayak, at Junagarh, Bikaner
 Octopussy, at Udaipur
 Om-Dar-Ba-Dar, at Pushkar
 One Water
 Paheli, at Nawalagarh, Jhunjhunu
 Parmanu: The Story of Pokhran, at Pokhran, Jaisalmer
 PK, at Mandawa, Jhunjhunu
 Prem Ratan Dhan Payo, at Udaipur
 Rang De Basanti at Nahargarh Fort, Jaipur
 Road, Movie (2010), at Jaisalmer
 Rudaali
 Saajan Chale Sasural, at Sariska Palace
 Shakespeare Wallah, at City Palace, Alwar
 Shakti: The Power, Kkhejadala Fort, Jodhpur
 Sher, at Jaipur, Rajasthan
 Siddhartha, at Deeg, Shri Mahaveer Ji
 Soldier
 Sonar Kella, at Jaisalmer
 Sooper Se Ooper, at Mandawa, Jhunjhunu
 Shuddh Desi Romance, at Jodhpur, Mehrangarh Fort, Johari Bazar, Jaipur
 Sultnat
 Trishna, at Jaipur
 Veer, at Jodhpur, Jaipur
 Yaadein, at Udaipur
 Yeh Jawaani Hai Deewani, at Bagore-ki-Haveli
 Beta, at Kanak Vrindavan, Jaipur
 Sabse Bada Khiladi, at Birla Mandir, Jaipur
 Lal Badshah, at Jaipur
 Mrityudata Gaurav Towers, Jaipur
 Bhool Bhulaiya, at Chomu Palace, Jaipur, Rajasthan
 Zubeida, at Narain Niwas Palace, Jaipur
 Taawdo The Sunlight (Rajasthani Film), at Bikaner
 Baadshaho, at Bikaner
 Saheb, Biwi Aur Gangster 3, at Bikaner
 Firangi, at Bikaner
 Koi Laut Ke Aaya Hai, at Bikaner
 Manikarnika: The Queen of Jhansi, at Bikaner
 Qarib Qarib Single, at Bikaner
The Dark Knight Rises, at Mehrangarh, Jodhpur

rockgroup.simdif.com 
 Hollywood and Bollywood movies that were filmed at Rajasthan

Films
Films shot in Rajasthan
Rajasthan